Rugby union in Venezuela is a team sport that is played as an amateur sport.

History
The history of rugby in Venezuela goes back to the fifties of the last century, when a group of English oil workers played the first match in Zulia State. Martell and Renault played the first organized match on 14 July 1974.

In 1978, the first rugby club formed exclusively with native players was founded at Simón Bolívar University: the Club de Rugby de la Universidad Simón Bolívar (CRUSB). In the course of time, more rugby teams were created in Caracas and other Venezuelan cities.

Governing body
The governing body is the Venezuelan Rugby Federation, which was founded in 1992. It is affiliated to World Rugby and Sudamérica Rugby.

National competitions 
The most important tournament is the Campeonato Nacional de Clubes (National Championship of Clubs) contested by Venezuelan men's clubs. Another notable tournament is the Torneo Internacional de Rugby Los Andes (Los Andes Rugby International Tournament) played at Mérida. Santa Teresa seven-a-side, the Circuito Nacional de Sevens (National Sevens Series) and the Seven de las Flores (Sevens of Flowers) are important club competitions in rugby sevens.

The matches of these competitions are played at weekends.

Popularity 
In Venezuela, rugby is not as popular as sports such as baseball, football or basketball. The coverage of rugby competitions by Venezuelan mass media is sporadic.

Years ago, rugby players had to fund themselves in the terms of uniforms, equipment, travel costs, etc. Recently, some financial support has come from the Venezuelan Ministry of Sport and private companies which offer sponsorship to the clubs.

Rugby in Venezuela is an amateur sport and rugby players receive no remuneration.

See also
 Venezuela national rugby union team
 Venezuela national rugby union team (sevens)
 Venezuela women's national rugby union team (sevens)
 Sport in Venezuela

References